Shaktimaan is an Indian Hindi-language superhero television show, created by Mukesh Khanna that aired on DD National  from 13 September 1997 to 27 March 2005.

Producer Mukesh Khanna played the role of Shaktimaan and his alter ego "Pandit Gangadhar Vidhyadhar Mayadhar Omkarnath Shastri", a photographer for the newspaper "Aaj Ki Aawaz". Shaktimaan was depicted as a human who has attained superhuman powers through meditation and five elements of nature: Space, Earth, Air, Fire, Water. Kitu Gidwani (later replaced by Vaishnavi Mahant) played the role of Geeta Vishwas, a reporter who loves Shaktimaan. Surendra Pal played the role of Tamraj Kilvish. The show was followed by "Shaktimaan: The Animated Series" in 2011, and a television film titled "Hamara Hero Shaktimaan" in 2013.

Plot
Since the dawn of mankind, humanity was at peace until the arrival of the Kali Yuga. Since then, greed and hatred have taken over humanity and have been deteriorating it for the past 6000 years. To end this, a mystical sect of saints known as "Suryanshis" chose a man to rise up against all odds and defeat the evil prevailing within the society. He was taught the way to energise the 7 chakras of the body through Kundalini Yoga that helped him get mystical and supernatural powers. During his training, he also conducted the ritual of death in order to get total control over his powers by entering the holy fire and immersing his physical body in it. When the five natural elements of life, fire, earth, water, wind, and sky invigorated his body, he gains superpowers and becomes a Superhuman. At last, he takes a pledge to finish corruption and injustice in society and fight the evil prevailing in the world. Due to his heroic initial works, he is named Shaktimaan by a reporter, Gita Viswas. Later, it is revealed that
Shaktimaan was the rebirth of Shri Satya who was part of the Suryanshi Sect during the Mahabharata era 5,000 years ago.

His alter ego is a funny geek named Pandit Gangadhar Vidyadhar Mayadhar Omkarnath Shastri, who works as a photographer in a daily newspaper office to maintain his secret identity as Shaktimaan and speaks pure Hindi.

Shaktimaan's enemy is Tamraj Kilvish, who is the living embodiment of the evil and dark forces of the world.

Cast

 Mukesh Khanna as Pandit Gangadhar Vidyadhar Mayadhar Omkarnath Shastri / Shaktimaan, Major Ranjeet Singh, Shree Satya, Evil Clone Shaktimaan
 Vaishnavi (Episode 9–450) as Gita Viswas
 Kitu Gidwani (Episode 1-8) as Gita Viswas
 Surendra Pal as Tamraj Kilvish / Guru Sarvagya
 Lalit Parimoo as Dr. Jaikaal (Jackal)
 Arun Bakshi as Dr. Jaikaal (in last few episodes)
 Amit Mishra as Dr. Jaikaal (in last few episodes)
 Tom Alter as 1st Mahaguru
 Arun Mathur as 2nd Mahaguru
 Salil Sudhakar as 3rd Mahaguru
 Gajendra Chauhan as 4th Mahaguru / Shuv
 Mohsin Memon as Appu (in first few episodes)
 Sharad Smart as Satyaprakash Nirala, the 1st editor of Aaj Ki Awaaz
 Ram Sethi as Harishchand Satyavadi, the editor of Dainik Dhamaka
 Dilip Darbar as Inspector Salim Qazi
 Jitu Mehta as Constable Bhinde
 Arvind Vekaria as Manager of Rajputana Dharamshala
 Allauddin Khan as Tony Bhai
 Raju Shrivastav as Durandhar Singh, the 2nd editor of Aaj Ki Awaaz
 Manjeet Kullar as Kaushalya, Shaktimaan's biological mother/ Maharani Shavalika
 Ashwini Kalsekar as Shalaaka / Kaali Billi
 Dolly Minhas as Shaliyaa / Safed Billi, elder sister, and guardian of Shalaaka
 Kishore Bhanushali as Naurangee the thief
 Rajendra Gupta as Prof. Gyanesh Viswas, paranormal scientist, Gita Viswas's father
 Nawab Shah as Mayor JJ "Jai Kumar Janardhan" / Kakodar
 Deepak Bhatia as Mathur / Girgit
 Mohan Gokhale as The Invisible Man
 Deepshikha Nagpal as Paroma and Sheraali (dual roles)
 Arun Bali as Dayal Chopra, Businessman, and owner of Aaj Ki Awaz
 Zahida Parveen as Nisha Saluja, a reporter who replaced Geeta at Aaj Ki Awaaz
 Shikha Swaroop as Alien (special appearance) / Jal rani
 Goga Kapoor as Vilas Rao
 Deepraj Rana as Inspector Jai Singh, a Corrupt Police officer
 Urvashi Dholakia as Maansi Sharma
 Neelam Mehra as Maansi
 Faqir Nabi as Kapala
 Raman Khatri as Sahab / Kumar Ranjan
 Jay Mishra as Ghosh Babu
 Sunila Karambelkar as Queen Mayaadri and Natasha in starting episodes
 Brijmohan Pandey as Bankelal / Toyman
 Sanjeev Chaddha as Shudhanshu Ji
 Ajit Mehra as Swami Ji
 Govind Khatri as Mahashay
 Shubhangi Latkar as Arundhati Devi
 Hemal Dharia as Hemal
 Urmila Amar as Leela Lautekar
 Nupur Alankar as Kamini, film gossip writer at Aaj Ki Awaaz
 Raj Premi as Johaharu
 Zeena Bhatia as Matandeeka Witch
 Annu Kashyap as Teemira / Behroopia
 Swati Anand as Sunanda
 Durgesh Nandini as Rachna (Punjabi Bahu)
 Shravani Goswami as Shalini (Bengali Bahu)
 Manav Sohal as Shalini's husband
 Preeti Puri as Inspector Amrita Arora

Production
Shaktimaan was conceptualised by Khanna in 1981 when he was working on a film with Rajshri Productions. He narrated the idea to producer Rajkumar Barjatya, who liked it, and the two adapted it into a film titled Akash. In November 1997, Screen reported quoted him: "I would watch my nephew sitting glued to the TV whenever Power Zone came on, shooting with imaginary fire guns, or operating some imaginary hi-fi gadget in his own little world. That's when it struck me that if I made Shaktimaan I would have a readymade audience of kids who are always most impressed with SFX tricks." Over the development of the titular character, Khanna said, "In Indian mythology, there are a lot of strong characters but no super-heroes. All we get to see our Superman or Spider-Man, who are alien concepts. That's why I decided to create an Indian superhero, Shaktimaan, who is born out of a yagna, and a result of all the creative energies of the universe. A superhero who can fly... disappear. And when he is not in his super-hero avataar, he's a bumbling photographer who always misses scooping much to the chagrin of his boss Geeta Vishwas." He added that the attire of Shaktimaan's alter ego, "complete with buck teeth and floppy hair", was inspired by American comedian Jerry Lewis.

Having wanted the "best ever" special effects seen on Indian television, following the series' airing, Khanna felt that it "[fell] is short of [his] expectations". He added, "When I had planned the serial I wanted the kind of special effects seen in Superman, Spider-Man and Terminator. Maybe I was too ambitious. Computer graphics has just arrived in India and there is lack of trained professionals here." He further said, the special effects for each episode cost him 2 lakh, and 10 lakh overall.
In 2004 Sign language interpretation was launched for the social message given at the end of the episodes.

The series was sponsored by Parle-G from its first episode.

In 2019, Khanna revealed through his YouTube channel Bheeshm International that the show had to be cancelled because the high broadcasting charges were bringing him losses, and not due to complaints of children imitating stunts from the show as popularly believed.

Broadcast
The series ran for 450 episodes from 13 September 1997 to 27 March 2005 on DD National.
The show was later dubbed and aired on several other Indian TV channels in various languages, in Tamil on DD Podhigai and in Odia on Tarang.
Reruns of the series also aired on   STAR Utsav and Dangal TV. A re-edited version of the series premiered on Pogo TV in 2006. The series was also dubbed in English language for the network.

The show was re-telecast from 1 April 2020 on DD National when the production of ongoing series had to be stopped by the channel due to COVID-19 pandemic. The series was also aired on DD Retro starting from 13 April 2020.

Home media and streaming services
The series was released on DVD by Ultra India. The series was also launched on their YouTube channel on 17 February 2011. A Bhojpuri language version was also launched on Ultra Kids Zone's YouTube channel in 2014.

The series was made available to stream on Amazon Prime Video in 2019.

Fictional biography

Origin
Shaktimaan received powers from seven gurus who trained and blessed him with "yogic shakti which was natural power." He was the chosen warrior against evil by Siddha gurus of a cult named Suryanshi. They are followers of the star Sun. As part of the training, he trained with Kundalini Yoga to awake the 7 chakras of the body and gain 'supernatural' powers from them. To gain complete control over his powers, he performed the ritual of death. However, this did not cause death but made him more alive than when he was a normal man. He also performed Yajna in which he entered the fire himself and dissolved his body in the fire. Then, the five elements of life, i.e. fire, wind, water, earth, sky revived his body giving him special powers from them. Thus, after leaving his mortal body, he was given a superhuman form to fight against the evil in the world as Shaktimaan.

After Shaktimaan was created, he set out to destroy his archenemy Kilvish. But, as the Mahaguru (Tom Alter) explained, Kilvish can only be defeated after evil is destroyed. Shaktimaan's mission is to destroy the sin within people, not the sinned people. Shaktimaan's adventures show him pursuing justice and saving his friends while Kilvish and his minions plot to defeat him.

Powers
Shaktimaan has superhuman powers that lie inside his body in his seven chakras of Kundalini attained through meditation. Shaktimaan worships God through the symbol Om. Truthfulness is his motto. He can even separate his body into five different bodies of fire, wind, water, earth, and sky. He is an expert, skilled and intelligent fighter and has fought with super-skilled enemies. He possesses physical powers like unlimited speed (up to the speed of light), strength, durability as well as psychic powers like telepathy, teleportation, telekinesis, etc.
Although he possesses godlike powers, his only weakness is a crystal (Papmani) possessed by Tamraj Kilvish which can be used to defeat and even kill him. This makes him powerless because it is filled with the evil of the world and is the source of the black powers. But he regains his strength after the crystal is taken away from him. He can be killed if the crystal is placed in front of him and he is treated violently to the verge of death. Shaktimaan also gets brief premonitions about the incidents that are going to happen to him in the future. This can be observed in Kashtak's episode, Geeta going to jail, and in Kapala's reappearance episodes.

Shaktimaan's powers are virtually limitless. He can do practically anything he imagines. The only limit to his powers is his own belief in himself and his knowledge of how to manifest his powers. His powers come from his chakras. (Note: Although we'll call them chakras in the Vedas, in the series dialogue they will also be called energy centers.)

The seven chakras in his body which give him powers are:
 Energy Chakra (1): This chakra gives Shaktimaan super strength, enabling him to fly, shoot fire from his hands, emit rays from his fingertips, blow a stream of freezing air, or send out protective force fields which nothing can penetrate (provided he can maintain his willpower and not give in). Shaktimaan's strength allows him to physically penetrate anything and lift any object.
 Creative Chakra (2): This chakra gives Shaktimaan the power to manifest things out of thin air.
 Astral Chakra (3): This chakra gives Shaktimaan the power to control his astral body (a semi-transparent, ethereal duplicate of himself) which can fly, walk through walls, see inside objects, etc.
 Heart Chakra (4): This chakra gives Shaktimaan the power to control the will of others, but only for good. He can will people to do the right thing, see the error in their ways. This power is most useful when Shaktimaan needs to stop someone who is under the control of Kilvish from doing evil.
 Vibration Chakra (5): This chakra gives Shaktimaan the power to control all types of vibrations, including sound waves, light waves, healing warmth, etc. He can also use it to hear ultrasonic sounds and can speed up the vibrations of his own atoms, allowing him to transport himself in space or time. This can be very useful for getting out of dangerous situations.
 Psychic Chakra (6): This chakra gives Shaktimaan the power of the "third eye", which enables him to read minds and see anywhere in the world at any distance. He can sense impending danger and see things at any corner of the world.

Personal life
To avoid being an easy prey of Tamraj Kilvish, Shaktimaan adopted an alter ego of Pandit Gangadhar Vidyadhar Mayadhar Omkarnath Shastri in the society. The character Gangadhar is completely opposite to that of Shaktimaan in all aspects, e.g. appearance, intelligence while he speaks pure Hindi. Whenever he gets an important job to do, he says that he has written a book on it which had never been published. Staying in society as a common person helped him to get knowledge about the crime. He got a job as a photographer for the newspaper Aaj Ki Awaaz after being interviewed by Geeta Vishwas. After a few weeks, he became a co-reporter working with Geeta. Through a series of incidents and the fact that he could never capture a photo of Shaktimaan, Geeta came to know about the dual identity of Shaktimaan, which was previously known only to Suryanshis. After Aaj Ki Awaaz was shut down, Gangadhar became a Hindi professor at a Tarun college. Later, he left the college to work for a news channel KR TV with Geeta.

Characters

Main characters

Shaktimaan / Gangadhar
Actor Mukesh Khanna portrays the main character of the show Shaktimaan and his alter ego Gangadhar. In the show, Shaktimaan was depicted as a character who had attained superhuman powers through meditation and five elements of nature. He is trained by a mystical sect of saints to fight against all odds and defeat the evil prevailing within the society.

Shaktimaan's alter ego is Gangadhar, who is a funny geek. He works as a photographer in a daily newspaper office to maintain his secret identity. He is portrayed as the complete opposite of Shaktimaan.

Gita Viswas
Gita Viswas (Vaishnavi Mahant, previously Kitu Gidwani), the female lead in the serial, used to work as a brave news reporter in Aaj Ki Awaaz. She was the first to report about Shaktimaan in a newspaper and named the superhero Shaktimaan. Incidentally, she was the only reporter to get interviews with Shaktimaan as Gangadhar used to accompany her as a photographer on missions. She died in a crash planned by Dr. Jackal. As Shaktimaan loved her, he brought her back to life again using his power, which resulted in losing his powers temporarily due to his against the nature actions. Gita came to know about this after Shaktimaan regained power with the vow that he will never repeat the same mistake again. To ensure this, she planned to leave the country. In the lead up to that situation, she got to know about Shaktimaan's dual character for the third time. But unlike the first two occasions, Shaktimaan didn't erase it from Gita's memory this time as she promised to keep it secret forever.

One year later‡, after Aaj Ki Awaaz was shut down, its staff members persuaded Gita in returning to India to join them to release Shaktimaan comics. Later, she teamed up with Gangadhar again and joined KR TV as a television reporter while working for the comics simultaneously.

‡ – When the journalist character Gita Viswas was written out of the series, fan protests prompted the producers to bring her back.

Gyanesh Vishwas
He is a scientist who was Gita's father and Ranjit Singh's friend. He encountered Ranjit Singh while on an expedition to perform research at a mysterious valley, where he and his team were attacked by invisible figures (later revealed to be Tamraj Kilvish's servants) that shot fires at them and was rescued by Ranjit Singh. When he went to the city and returned to meet Ranjit Singh at the forest later, he found out that Ranjit Singh and the whole group of soldiers there had been killed. He writes the incidents in his diary. Many years later, Shaktimaan wanted to know more about Ranjit Singh from Gyanesh, as he didn't know Ranjit Singh was actually Shaktimaan's father and he was only raised by Pandit Vidyadhar Shastri. However, Gyanesh is killed by Dr. Jackal before it happens. Later, Gita gives Gangadhar Gyanesh's diary which helps him find out the truth.

Enemies

Tamraj Kilvish
Tamraj Kilvish is Shaktimaan's archenemy and overall the main antagonist of the entire franchise. Tamraj means King of Darkness (Tama = darkness, raj = king) and Kilvish means shameful. He has lived 6000 years and is the source of evil in the world. He intends to rule the world by spreading darkness, hatred, sin, and evil. It is said that the source of his strength is one-half of the "Shakti Punj" (the half which is referred to as "Shaktiman") which he managed to retain after he originally obtained the entire Shakti Punj by deceit from Shri Satya (Satya means truth), the founder of the Suryavanshi. However, it is also mentioned that the source of his strength is the evil that is committed by people in this world.

It was later revealed that only Shri Satya can kill Tamraj Kilvish. After a death-defying adventure, Shaktimaan was told that he is the rebirth of Shri Satya. Shri Satya had given the exact time of the child's birth and the place before he died about 6000 years ago. Tamraj also knows this and this is the main reason he is frightened by the appearance of Shaktimaan as he knows that only Shaktimaan can kill Tamraj. He murdered Shaktimaan's parents and his adoptive father, Pandit Vidyadhar Shastri. He and his minion's plot to kill him but always fail. His minions include Electric-man (who can shoot lightning bolts from his body), Stone-man (who can shoot stones from his body), Plastica (who can stretch any part of her body), Dr. Jackal (an evil scientist), and others. Dr. Jackal has helped Kilvish in his various schemes by cloning Shaktimaan and also by turning aliens against him.

In the television series, Kilvish is often treated as the personification of darkness itself even though he was once a human being who later becomes very powerful and commits many evil deeds. In an attempt to become immortal, he left his mortal body and took an ethereal body that can't be killed but Shaktimaan is told that he has to kill all the evil in the world to destroy Tamraj's ethereal body. Kilvish's trademark quote is "Andhera Kaayam Rahe" (May Darkness Prevail), which is also used by his followers.

Kilvish's character evolves as the series progresses. In the beginning episodes of Shaktimaan, his face is never shown and his voice is different from the voice that he uses in the later episodes of Shaktimaan, in which his role is played by Surendra Pal. Later his face deforms to become a distorted wolf-like face.

Dr. Jackal
Dr. "Jackal" Vishvamitra Shandilya is an evil scientist who works for Kilvish. His earlier intention was not that of becoming evil, but when he was denied scholarship for research, Kilvish provided him with funds and labs, thus making him a supporter of Kilvish and an evil scientist.
Though he is overall a brilliant scientist, his specialisation is cloning and various energy rays.
His creations against Shaktimaan include Kekda Man (a clone formed by fusing cells of Crab & human), followed by Jonk Jonkaa (a clone using leech), an evil clone of Shaktimaan, Plastica,
Lightman, 3D image, Super-heroine Sunanda and others. He also invented a height control solution and fictional EC- rays.

Sahab
Sahab is an organised criminal and drug lord. Like Shaktimaan he also possesses a double identity, the other being that of a law-abiding industrialist and Mayor, known as Kumar Ranjan. Except for Tamraj Kilvish (and later Dr. Jackal), no one knows that Sahab and Kumar Ranjan are the same people, thus making this his biggest strength. Through his criminal mind, Sahab keeps plotting ways to create trouble for Shaktimaan or to defame him and to find out about the real identity of Shaktimaan.

Other antagonists

Kakodar
Kakodar is a sorcerer with the visage of a devil who was imprisoned in a statue nearly five hundred years ago. He could only be freed if a good person removes a thread from his neck. It is unclear whether he was cursed by an enemy or punished by Tamraj to end up imprisoned. In the present day, the mayor of Mumbai, Jai Kumar Janardhan a.k.a. JJ (Nawab Shah) was deceived by his personal assistant Mathur (Deepak Bhatia) to break the thread and free him. Mayor JJ died in shock at seeing Kakodar's true form. As instructed by Madhur, Kakodar possessed JJ's body and decided to spread Andhera (darkness).

He was the primary supervillain in the first part of the series as he uses JJ's wealth and power to hatch plots to kill Shaktimaan but always failed. Unlike most of the other assailants of Shaktimaan, he is very sharp and analytical. He even tries to approach Tarendra, an all-knowing sentient being of light, to know the truth about Shaktimaan. He is cunning enough to be able to use mental manipulation to trick Shaktimaan on occasion. This put the hero into a dilemma, and self-doubt drained him of his powers temporarily.

The full extent of his powers is not revealed. On an occasion, JJ's girlfriend Zuby realises that JJ is possessed by a demon and tries to reveal him in public. He uses hypnosis to drive her mad so that the public will ignore her statements. He has a potent and fatal poison inside him that he can spit out of his mouth which affects everyone except Shaktimaan. Shaktimaan and Kakodar end things in a fight when Kakodar turns into his real form and Shaktimaan turns him back to a statue.

Natasha
Natasha (Portrayed by Sunila Karambelkar) was also a demonic evil woman sent by Kilvish. Along with Mathur, she serves JJ/Kakodar. She was JJ's secretary before he was possessed. She has the ability to change her appearance. She kills a C.B.I. officer and takes her appearance to interrogate Gangadhar and Geeta on one occasion. Her powers were greatly diminished due to Shaktimaan defeating Kakodar. To regain the power she and Madhur decide to sacrifice Shaktimaan. For this they kidnap the son of a scientist to get the formula of invisible man which may help to defeat Shaktimaan.

Mathur
Mathur (Deepak Bhatia) is one of the two trusted demonic accomplices of JJ/Kakodar along with Natasha. He initially served JJ as his personal assistant (PA) before he was possessed, but was secretly preparing the stage for Kakodar's entry under Tamraj's directions. His true identity is revealed after Kakodar is released from his imprisonment. Not many of his powers are revealed in the series. He has the ability to change his appearance at will, but not shapeshift to assume someone else's body. He also loses his powers when Kakodar was defeated by Shaktimaan.

Electric-man
He was the first synthetic villain faced by Shaktimaan. Dr. Chandola, an evil scientist, created him. Dr. Chandola claims that the Electric man was his son, whom he killed so that he can resurrect the dead body with electricity. When he comes to life he kills Dr. Chandola. Without recognising a friend from a foe he kills everyone in his path and spreads destruction in the city. His powers include shooting electricity from eyes and electrocution on contact. Finding him difficult to restrain, Shaktimaan grabs him and tunnels deep into the earth, pushing him deep underground.

Kapala
Kapala is a corrupted Tantrik who serves Tamraj Kilvish. His primary skill is his shapeshifting to inanimate objects such as vehicles and weapons. He also has many other magical devices and servants under his control. One such device is a metal plate he wears around his neck that has the power to steal his opponent's strength. The villain Stone man was created from his magic skull. Shaktimaan destroys both the metal plate and the magic skull. He has an odd sense of humour as he makes jokes while fighting Shaktimaan. There are occasions where he serves as comic relief. This is in contrast to other villains who are stark and serious. He also has a very fragile ego and falls victim to taunts. His main accessory is a trident. Shaktimaan eventually turns him into stone and shatters him at one instance. However, in later episodes of Shaktimaan, he is shown resurrected back to life. He is played by Faqir Nabi.

Khali-Bali
Khali and Bali are two dwarvish green and red imps. Their names originate from the Urdu word Khalbali which means commotion. Throughout their appearances, they constantly argue and reconcile with each other over inane reasons. They claim to eat humans but there is no evidence regarding the same. They can combine to form a single full-size demon. This demon wears green and red garb. Their power is insignificant when they are separated but when they both combine they become as physically strong as a full-fledged demon. Not much is shown regarding any psychic powers they possess.

Kashtak
During an archaeological dig in the qila(fort) at Bhangdu Khati, the lead archaeologist Prof. Hussain and his assistant Hema discover a sarcophagus and a mysteriously untarnished sword made out of an unknown metal in the ruins. Hema accidentally opens the sarcophagus and unleashes Kashtak, a servant of Tamraj Kilvish. Kashtak used to terrorise the world and was imprisoned nearly 2500 years ago by the curse of Komalatha, a lady sage. Geeta Vishwas turns out to be the reincarnation of Komalatha. His sword Khadgi has many powers imbued in them such as telekinesis, petrification, and resurrection and control of his army. In the series, it is enhanced with the power of mind control by Tamraj. When he controls the mind of a scientist to create a weapon of mass destruction, Shaktimaan stops him .

Kekda Man
Kekda man (Crab man) is one of the two dangerous clones of Dr. Jackal (along with Jonk Jonkaa). He is a clone created by Dr. Jackal by fusing cells of crab and a kidnapped Suryanshi. Dr. Jackal managed to twist the mind of the pure Suryanshi to become the Kekda man. He can breathe fire which contains an extremely dangerous poison that even impeded Shaktimaan. Shaktimaan left an illusion of him behind and narrowly escaped. Because he returns with only the illusion, Kekda man is destroyed by his short-tempered creator.

Jonk Jonkaa
Jonk (leech) is one of the two most dangerous clones of Dr. Jackal (along with Kekda Man); He was created by fusing genes of humans and alien leech from Mars. He has the power to eat any form of matter and grow larger in size. He was killed by Geeta and the campers using salt. Shaktimaan is however captured in a flying prison in the process.

Evil clone Shaktimaan
After capturing Shaktimaan, Dr. Jackal makes a clone of him but twists his mind to be a servant of darkness. The evil clone is created stronger than Shaktimaan and is unleashed on the world. When the real Shaktimaan escapes his prison, he challenges the evil clone to a fight. He then captures the clone and sends him into deep space.

Later, during the crash when Geeta and her father, Gyanesh, died, Dr. Jackal's missiles released him from his trap. He comes to the Earth searching for Shaktimaan, unable to find him as Shaktimaan had lost his power. Geeta is misled into believing the clone was the real Shaktimaan until he was killed by the real Shaktimaan who gained his power later.

Catsisters
Shalaka & Shaliyaa(portrayed by Ashwini kalsekar & Dolly Minhas)
Kilvish sent Shaliyaa the white cat to kill Major Ranjith singh, However, in the process Shaliyaa failed in her attempt and cursed by kilvish as a cat. Years later kilvish Sent Shalaka the black cat to kill his son Shaktimaan with the wrong info that Shaliyaa was killed by Major Singh, so it is a chance to take revenge by his son Shaktimaan. Shalakaa captures Shaktimaan and tortures him. In the process she accidentally kills her sister, thinking the cat was Shaktimaan's supporter, and it is revealed that the whole time kilvish was lying to her. She leaves Shaktimaan and heads to Kilvish to kill him. However, she is stabbed and killed by Kilvish.

Teemiraa
Teemira (portrayed by Annu Kashyap) was another devil magician sent by Tamraaj to kill Shaktimaan in childhood but she failed. Tamraaj tortured her in a fire for several years for this. Later he again gives her a chance to kill Shaktimaan with a warning but Teemiraa was planning to kill both Shaktimaan and Tamraaj Kilvish. She drinks Human blood like a vampire so that she can maintain her charm and be young always. She kidnaps and tortures Geeta Vishwas and takes her form as an identity to set trap for Shaktimaan for making him as a partner, in the process kilvish kills her for her misbehaves.In 2005 Diamond Comics
Shaktimaan issue "Paap Samraat" has a more detailed story with the encounters of teemira and baby Gangadhar.

Matandeeka
She was a devil creature who works for Kilvish, she hitches somebody on-road and kills him brutally by taking his spirit. She wants to become powerful, so she goes in front of Kilvish for her request. Kilvish tells her to Kill Shaktimaan and she will become what she wants. Her look was mostly similar to Teemiraa, she wears a red dress and also the background score of Teemiraa was played on her.

Toyman
Toyman's character was played by Brij Mohan Pandey. He is mentally a psycho lover who kills his love interest Shailaa after she lodged a complaint against him to the police. To make more profit, he made toys using low-priced colours which are harmful to children, causing death to many children and he was jailed after Shailaa reported it. He killed Shailaa on returning from Jail. Later he created dangerous toys as weapons to destroy Shaktimaan.

Kalushaah
She is a devil woman, running her black world as an agent of Tamraj Kilvish. She is so cruel that she kills her own servants who can't do her given work. She made the jungle of Karadunga, her penthouse, a mysterious place so that no one can come there. Once, she attacked Shaktimaan's father Ranjeet Singh when he tried to investigate the secrets of Karadunga. Later, Shaktimaan ruins her world, leaving her no way but to flee.

Maharani Mayadri
Her role was played by actress Sunila Karambekar as a villain. She enters when Shaktimaan, Dwijj, Geeta time-travel upon centuries Diamond Comics collect chakra, but they were unable as Queen Mayadri makes them her hostages. She thought of the Shaktimaan as Satya, the Mahaguru, who was once a king but later became a priest as he loves the environment of the forest. His fighting skills make maharani fell in love with him and she proposes to Satya, but he rejects her. It makes her angry and so psycho that she creates her own world where she rules like a queen. She also has many magical powers that nobody can destroy her. Later after telling the story to Shaktimaan, she also told him that she is immortal and nobody can kill her. Shaktimaan wants the time machine remote from Maharaniji which she stole from him while kidnapping Geeta and Dwijj to an unknown place. Shaktimaan requests Maharaniji to return the remote and free both hostages. For her love, she shows both Geeta and Dwijj. Later Maharaniji attacked Geeta with her magical dangerous rays so cruelly that she can be dead. What happened then is shown in the remaining episode.

Behroopia
She has the power to shapeshift to any appearance. On one occasion, she changes her appearance to that of Shaktimaan and engages in a fake fight to defame Shaktimaan. Later she again changes her shape to that of Geeta Vishwaas to give mislead people through an interview on television about Shaktimaan. Shaktimaan was able to reveal her real appearance to everyone later. Dr. Jackal punishes her angrily for her failure and kills her.

Sunanda
She was a mutant like Akansha. She can touch any electrical wave and make her powers. Her neighbours want to kill her as they think that she is a witch. She was saved by Suryanshi samuday, who want to help her. But she was kidnapped by Dr. Jackal. He offers her to make more powerful than Shaktimaan to revenge society. He converts her to a superwoman and uses her to destroy Shaktimaan's status with another devil woman Behroopia. Later Sunanda changes heart and surrenders after seeing the reality of Kilvish and Jaikaal.

Kitanuman
Kitanuman is an extremely dangerous green-coloured creature completely made from germs and is also one of the servants of tamraj kilvish. Thousands of years ago, Shri Satya turned him into a statue, and later he gets freed from the statue and spreads germs so badly and turn each and every child of the world into old men. Kitanuman was one of the most dangerous and difficult devils to defeat Shaktimaan and had a really tough time with him. However, later Shaktimaan kills him using his own germs. Later when Shaktimaan defeats and burns him in space, unknown to Shaktimaan his germs do not completely finish and are left in space. A space guard Sheena, while coming towards the earth sees and take the germs and store them in a protective jar and later along with another space guard Mr. Subkar they try to kill germs, but Dr. Jackal comes and injure them and takes the germs. He again brings kitanuman back to life, but later Shaktimaan freezes Dr. Jackal, Nadia (his assistant), Kitanuman, along with 3 dangerous criminals of space and sentences them in the Inter-Galactic Prison (A prison made in a galaxy near the sun made by the space guards Mr. Subkar and Sheena).

Wolfa
An extremely dangerous humanoid clone created by Dr. Jackal. She was made by combining the genetic material of a human, a snake, and a wolf. She is the only clone with three animal attributes. Her MO is to attract a person towards her and then kill them instantly by touch, and subsequently drink their blood. Later Shaktimaan kills her.

Pretolla
Like Tamraj Kilvish he has also lived more than 6000 years and is a ghost-like creature he is extremely dangerous and when he gets hungry he eats away the body of the whole world and makes them ghosts, he gets hungry very often once in 1000 years. 6000 years ago when he was in space Shri Satya created a protective coating around the earth, because of which he couldn't enter the earth for 6000 years. The protective coating could be broken by Shri Satya only or his rebirth Shaktimaan which was impossible, but Tamraj Kilvish controlled Shaktimaan's brain with the power of smashed Divya mani and Shaktimaan broke the coating and allowed Pretolla to enter the earth as soon as he entered he turned half of the people of earth in ghosts as Tamraj Kilvish had only the half part of Shaktipunja (Pap Punja). Tamraj Kilvish sends his men to find the remaining part of Shaktipunja whereas Shaktimaan travels time in different time zone along with Geeta and Dwijj to collect 8 chakras and save the world. Later, Shaktimaan is successful in collecting 8 chakras of life from different time zones and saves the world, and Pretolla is sent out of the earth and the protective coating is again made.

Dakoda
He is another devil sent by Tamraj Kilvish to kill Shaktimaan. He is completely made from fire and Tamraj Kilvish awoke him from thousands of years of his sleeping to kill Shaktimaan. He first spread destruction in the city by showing himself as Ranjeet Singh, Shaktimaan's father, but dies due to the attack of nitrogen gas which him, but he again re-emerges. Shaktimaan later killed him with nitrogen gas.

Lightman
He was created by Dr. Jackal when he was rescued from jail by Sahab, one of the main enemies of Shaktimaan. He released him from prison to help him to kill Shaktimaan, he created Lightman by cloning one hair of Shaktimaan and sunlight. Later Shaktimaan took all light from Lightman and took it inside his body which made him extremely weak but he managed to fly to the sun and transferred the light in the sun.

Plastica
The most dangerous creation of Dr. Jackal, she is made of plastic and releases extremely dangerous poisonous gas which kills people in seconds. She can stretch any part of her body and there is no way to kill her.

Froga
He is a half-human half frog, he is really powerful and has a really long and sticky tongue which is really dangerous. His tongue is his main power source which he uses to catch its prey. He (along with Visdhar, Behroopia, and Chinksu) spread a lot of destruction in the city but was defeated by Shaktiman and three other powerful Suryanshis.

Stone-man
He was created by Kapala, a servant of Tamraj Kilvish using his magic skull. He is made entirely of stone. His glance can turn any inanimate object to stone. On humans, the glance can only petrify them. His glance follows the rules of electromagnetic radiation and can be reflected. The Stone-man kidnaps Santa Claus from a party and disguises himself as the Santa. When he starts attacking Shaktimaan at the party, Shaktimaan cleverly evades his glances. Shaktimaan uses a metal tray to turn his glance back to him, petrifying the Stone-man. He then switches appearances with Stone-man and deceives Kapala into attacking him. Kapala is hurt badly and Shaktimaan uses this opportunity to destroy the magic skull of Kapala. The Stone-man disappears when the skull is destroyed.

Chinksu
He is really powerful in hand-to-hand combat and is an expert in martial arts. He can break trees into two pieces with his one punch. He (along with froga, Behroopia, and Visdhar) spread a lot of destruction in the city but was defeated by Shaktiman and three other powerful Suryanshis.

Visdhar
He is half-snake half-human and releases extremely dangerous poison from his mouth. His poison weakens Shaktimaan. He (along with Froga, Behroopia, and Chinksu) spread a lot of destruction in the city but was defeated by Shaktiman and three other powerful Suryanshis.

Dr. Chandola
Dr. Chandola is a mad scientist who aspired to create an army of humans from dead bodies resurrected with electricity. His first experiment was his own son, who he personally kills to create Electric Man. Although he was involved in the grave robbing crimes, he was not shown successful with any of the dead bodies he collected. When Electric Man comes to life, he kills Dr. Chandola and his associates.

Other characters

The family of three daughter-in-laws
A family with three daughters-in-law from three different communities, Rachna (Punjabi), Shalini (Bengali), and a South Indian always fights with each other. Gangadhar as a servant and cook enters the family and creates happiness among them.

Mr. Sabkar
An alien space guard, who is extremely powerful but not evil. He is on the side of truth and he is so powerful that bullets, electricity, etc. do not harm him, his mind works faster than computers and can also fly. Therefore, his name is Sabkar. Sab means "everything" and kar means " done". He can do many things which are beyond a normal human-like he can stay underwater for hours without breathing. He became popular by name Sabkar in media particularly in Krtv channel in which Geeta and Gangadhar work and so they were sent for Sabkar interview to know if he is another identity of Shaktimaan. He (along with Sheena another powerful space guard) was in the process of killing the germs of Kitanuman when Dr. Jackal attacked them and they had to flee. Even Suriyanshis do not know about it. He (along with Sheena) is the owner of InterGalactic Prison. Later in a spaceship, they follow Jaikal but Jaikal blasts their spaceship, and Mr. Sabkar and Sheena are badly injured and turn. So Shaktimaan finds a special flower to save them and in the process, he catches Dr. Jackal and then freezes him along with the others in the InterGalactic Prison (A prison made in a galaxy near the sun made by the space guards Mr. Subkar and Sheena). When Mr. Subkar and Sheena are saved they are about to leave, the mayor of the city, Kumar Ranjan comes and names them foreign spies living visas and does not allow them to go. Later to defame Shaktimaan he spreads a virus in the city and says it is done by the space guards. Also, he kidnaps Mr. Subkar and Sheena and tells it's done by Shaktimaan and an arrest comes out for Shaktimaan, but Mr. Subkar and Sheena brings the truth by showing the real face of Kumar Ranjan.

Sheena
Another powerful space guard. She first came to the earth in her space, when Shaktimaan tried to stop her he was attacked by powerful rays from her space. Like Mr. Subkar's electricity and bullets do not harm her, her mind is faster than a computer and she can also fly. She (along with Mr. Subkar) is the owner of InterGalactic Prison. Sheena and Mr. Subkar were the first people who saw Shaheb's real face and made him arrested by the police. Later in a spaceship, they follow Jaikal but Jaikal blasts their spaceship, and Mr. Subkar and Sheena are badly injured and turn. So Shaktimaan finds a special flower to save them and in the process, he catches Dr. Jackal and then freezes him along with the others in the Inter-Galactic Prison (A prison made in a galaxy near the sun made by the space guards Mr. Subkar and Sheena). When Mr. Subkar and Sheena are saved they are about to leave Mayor of the city Kumar Ranjan comes and names them foreign spy living visas and does not allow them to go. Later to defame Shaktimaan he spreads a virus in the city and says it is done by the space guards. Also kidnaps Mr. Subkar and Sheena and tells it's done by Shaktimaan and an arrest comes out for Shaktimaan, but Mr. Subkar and Sheena bring the truth by showing the real face of Kumar Ranjan.

Dr. Shishir
He is a really powerful Suryanshi or even one of the most powerful Suryanshis, he possesses telekinetic power and can bring anyone to himself and even no one can move if he catches them. He lives with Sanjeev Mahashay at the secret places of Suryanshis in the city and even runs a hospital. He has also helped Shaktimaan many times in defeating Tamraj Kilvish's armies.

Vivek / Andhi and Abhimanyu
He is a really powerful Suryanshi he has the power of wind and it comes out from his eyes. He lives with Sanjeev Mahashay at the secret places of Suryanshis in the city and even runs a hospital. One blow from his mouth throws the person wherever he wants. He is later killed by Tamraj Kilvish but his brother Abhimanuv has the same powers. He joins them and fills his place and also helped Shaktimaan many times in defeating Tamraj Kilvish's armies.

Abhinav / Vidyut
He is a really powerful Suryanshi he has the power of fire and fire rays come out from his eyes. He lives with Sanjeev Mahashay at the secret places of Suryanshis in the city and even runs a hospital. He has also helped Shaktimaan many times in defeating Tamraj Kilvish's armies. He is also rarely shown using 'Murli-Magic', to ensnare his gurus to act upon his will.

Sanjeev Mahashay
The Chief head of all the Suryanshis places in the city. He first met Shaktimaan as Gangadhar when he lost his memory. He is a genius and is very powerful, with the help of his brainpower he can break anything and even kill anyone. He has the power of Earth and his voice reaches till the end of the earth wherever he wants he is the head of a hospital.

Jwaala and Euroo
They are aliens from Sudoku planet. They landed on earth to save their lives from the three evil aliens who want to destroy everything. Later Dr. Jackal kidnaps them, to use their powers for darkness (andhera).

Kamini
Nupur Alankaar plays the role of Kaamini, a flirty, filmy gossip writer in the newspaper Aaj ki Aawaz. She often attempts to flirt with Gangaadhar and fires taunts at Geeta.

Shaila
Toyman is like a friend to Shaila. But Toyman loves her. After using poisonous colours in toys many children die. As a result, Toyman is sent to jail. Shaila begins hating him and never wants to see his ugly face again. She is later married to a new man. When Toyman discovers this, he finds her and kills her along with her whole family.

Shalu
Shalu is a small-time thief turned fan of Shaktimaan. Her accomplice is Tilly, another crook. She is someone who has lost faith in the system and adopted a life of crime. However, her adoration for Shaktimaan starts cultivating good thoughts in her. She has a tomboy personality and is courageous enough to take on multiple goons. She has moderate skill in hand-to-hand combat.

Reception
Shaktimaan was one of the most popular and longest-running television series for Indian children on the Doordarshan channel. In an interview with Nupur Rekhi of indiantelevision.com, Khanna told that he has even received letters from the external affairs minister and then Prime Minister of India Atal Bihari Vajpayee saying that he has done a very good thing in choosing the role of Shaktimaan and keeping up with it. He has been featured in The Wall Street Journal on the front page reflecting on Shaktimaan's (and hence Khanna's) positive influence on children.

When Shaktimaan  aired on Doordarshan, there were a lot of controversies created as children set themselves on fire or jumped off buildings hoping that Shaktimaan would save them. In an effort to promote responsible behaviour among children, Mukesh Khanna spent a substantial part of the airtime in explaining to the children that the stunts shown on television were not real and should not be emulated. Khanna also stated that most of the controversies were fake and were raised in the media to undermine its popularity.

Universe

Shaktimaan has generated other media including comic books, Animated series, Television film, and YouTube mini-episodes with characters from the series.

Comic books
Comic books appeared featuring Shaktimaan and published in many Indian languages as well as English in association with Diamond Comics and Raj Comics. Raj Comics published 13 titles.

Shaktimaan: The Animated Series (2011–12)
Shaktimaan: The Animated Series produced by Reliance Animation was aired on Sonic from 2011 to 2012.

Hamara Hero Shaktimaan (2013)
Hamara Hero Shaktimaan (Our Hero Shaktimaan) is a television film that aired on Pogo TV on 30 June 2013.

Sorry Shaktimaan (2019–present)
On 15 March 2019, a show named Sorry Shaktimaan started on a YouTube channel having the same name. It is the educational section of Shaktimaan.

Dhamaka (2020)
A Shaktimaan reference was made in the 2020 Malayalam language romantic comedy film Dhamaka in which a character visualises another character as Shaktimaan. Mukesh Khanna initially wanted to take legal action against the makers but later allowed them to use the reference.

Shaktimaan film trilogy
Shaktimaan is an upcoming Indian superhero film in the franchise. Mukesh Khanna officially confirmed on his official YouTube channel that he is making Shaktimaan not only with Sony Pictures Networks India but with Sony International. On 10 February 2022, SPE India made the announcement on Twitter with a short concept video showing the rise of Shaktimaan.

The video shows a flying camera and glasses, which were signature accessories of Shaktimaan's alter ego journalist Pandit Gangadhar, followed by the emblem on the superhero's chest. It was also reported that the film would be part of a trilogy.

See also

 Space Sheriff Gavan
 Superman

References

External links
 

Shaktimaan
1997 Indian television series debuts
2005 Indian television series endings
DD National original programming
Indian action television series
Indian Armed Forces in fiction
Indian children's television series
Indian fantasy television series
Indian superhero television shows
Science fantasy television series
Television series about shapeshifting
Television shows adapted into comics
Television shows adapted into films